A stranglehold is a grappling hold that strangles the opponent.

Stranglehold may also refer to:

Music
 "Stranglehold" (Ted Nugent song), a single by Ted Nugent
 "Stranglehold" (Paul McCartney song), a single by Paul McCartney
 "Stranglehold", a song by British punk band UK Subs
 Stranglehold, a punk rock band with Taang! Records

Films and TV
 Stranglehold (1931 film), a 1931 British film by Henry Edwards
 Stranglehold (1963 film), a 1963 British film by Lawrence Huntington
 Stranglehold (1994 film), a 1994 American film by Cirio H. Santiago
 "Stranglehold" (Ghost Whisperer), an episode of the television series Ghost Whisperer

Other uses
 Stranglehold (video game), the video game sequel to the movie Hard Boiled